Sir John George Tollemache Sinclair, 3rd Baronet (8 November 1825 – 30 September 1912) was a Scottish landowner and Liberal politician who sat in the House of Commons from 1869 to 1885.

Early life
Born in Edinburgh in 1825, he was the son of Sir George Sinclair, 2nd Baronet, and Lady Catherine Camilla Tollemache, daughter of William Talmash, Lord Huntingtower. He was a Page of Honour for Queen Adelaide.

Sinclair was educated at Cheam School and the University of Durham.

Career
He served as a lieutenant in the Scots Fusilier Guards. In 1861 he was made Vice-Lieutenant for Caithness.

In 1868 he succeeded his father to the baronetcy. Sinclair was elected Member of Parliament for Caithness in 1869 and held the seat until 1885. His majority of 13 over the Conservative candidate at the 1874 election is one of the smallest on record. At the 1885 General election, his son Clarence succeeded him as Liberal candidate, but was defeated by Gavin Brown Clark, the Crofters' Party candidate.

Personal life
In 1853, Sinclair married Emma Standish, daughter of William Standish, Duxbury Park, Lancashire, and Cocken Hall, Durham. Before their marriage was dissolved in 1878, the couple had two sons and two daughters:

 Amy Camilla Sinclair (–1925), who married John Henry Udny of Udny Castle, grandson of diplomat John Udny.
 Nina Mary Adelaide Sinclair (1856–1924), who married Owen Lewis Cope Williams, son of Lt.-Col. Thomas Peers Williams.
 Clarence Granville Sinclair (1858–1895), who married American heiress Mabel Sands, daughter of Mahlon Day Sands, and half-sister of Ethel Sands.
 George Felix Standish Sinclair JP (1861–1943), who married Margaret Sinclair, a daughter of Alexander Young Sinclair (son of Sir John Sinclair, 6th Baronet).

Sir John died on 30 September 1912. As he predeceased his eldest son Clarence, he was succeeded in the baronetcy by his grandson Archibald Henry Macdonald Sinclair, who was later created Viscount Thurso in 1952.

Interests

Sinclair was the earliest born person to have made a gramophone disc recording. He made titles for Columbia, Gramophone and Typewriter Ltd. and Odeon, all in 1906. He also commissioned a statue of Mary, Queen of Scots, at 143–144 Fleet Street, London.

References

External links 
 
 

1825 births
1912 deaths
Baronets in the Baronetage of Great Britain
John
Scottish Liberal Party MPs
Members of the Parliament of the United Kingdom for Scottish constituencies
UK MPs 1868–1874
UK MPs 1874–1880
UK MPs 1880–1885
People educated at Cheam School
Politicians from Edinburgh
Scots Guards officers
Scottish landowners
Alumni of University College, Durham
19th-century Scottish businesspeople